Bharat Kapoor is an Indian film and television actor.

Career
He has been acting since 1972 and starred in the television series Bhagyavidhaata on India's Colors television channel between 2009 and 2011.

Filmography

Films

 Jangal Mein Mangal (1972) .... Police Inspector
 Nafrat (1973) .... Kishan
 Hindustan Ki Kasam (1973) .... Usman
 Hanste Zakhm (1973) .... Somesh's friend
 Gupt Gyan (1974)... Doctor 
 Jaaneman (1976)
 Saheb Bahadur (1977) .... Doctor
 Inkaar (1977) .... Manmohan
 Toote Khilone (1978)
 Dil Se Mile Dil (1978) .... Inspector
 Des Pardes (1978) .... Murarilal
 Noorie (1979) .... Basheer Khan
Beqasoor (1980 film)...Inspector Shekhar Purohit
 Ram Balram (1980) .... Chandarbhan
 Nakhuda (1981) .... Saifu (Sheikhu's son)
 Love Story (1981) .... Basheera
 Bulundi (1981) as Harish
 Sannata (1981) as Sarika's uncle
 Aapas Ki Baat (1981) as Vinod Sinha
 Taaqat (1982 film).... Sher Singh 
 Bazaar (1982) .... Akhtar Hussain
 Ustadi Ustad Se (1982) .... Prem
 Swami Dada (1982) .... Lallu
 Painter Babu (1983) .... Sheru
 Qayamat (1983) .... Makhan
 Preet Na Jane Reet (1984)
 Paapi Pet Ka Sawaal Hai (1984)
 Maan Maryada (1984) as Thakur Vikram Singh
 Teri Pooja Kare Sansaar (1985)
 Karm Yudh (1985) as Shakti
 Haqeeqat (1985) .... Pandey's advocate
 Ghulami (1985) as Thakur Shakti Singh
 Meetha Zehar (1985)
 Balidaan (1985) as Jaggu
 Surkhiyaan (The Headlines) (1985) .... R. Pradhan
 Ek Daku Saher Mein (1985) .... Lala Manohar Lal
 Hum Naujawan (1985) as College Trustee
 Patton Ki Bazi (1986) .... Balwant Sethi 'Billa'
 Haathon Ki Lakeeren (1986) .... Lalit's lawyer
 Aakhree Raasta (1986) .... Dr. Varma
  Pyar Ki Jeet (1987) .... Jagirdar
 Satyamev Jayate (1987) .... Police Inspector Ravi Verma
Mere Baad (1988)... Police Inspector
 Sone Pe Suhaaga (1988) .... Prakash,Union Leader
 Khoon Bahaa Ganga Mein (1988)
 Jag Wala Mela (1988) .... Chaudhry
 Hum Farishte Nahin (1988) .... INSP. Verma
Aag Ke Sholay (1988)..Zamindar
 Pyar Ka Mandir (1988) .... Gopal Khaitan
 Parbat Ke Us Paar (1988)
 Jurrat (1989) .... Kama's lawyer
 Jaaydaad (1989) .... Thakur Bharat (Shanti's Husband)
 Bhabo (1989) .... Mahender
Kahan Hai Kanoon{1989}... Senior Police Officer
 Ilaaka (1989) .... Birju
 Sikka (1989) .... Gupta (Pranlal's Agent)
 Apna Desh Paraye Log (1989)...Corrupt Police Officer
 Pyasi Nigahen (1990) .... Politician Suryabhan
 Kroadh (1990) .... Jailor
 Swarg (1990) .... Nagpal
 C.I.D. (1990) .... Sunil Saxena
 Trinetra (1991) .... Bhavishyavani
 Phoolwati (1991)
 Khel (1991) .... Vinod's Elder Brother
 Bhediyon Ka Samooh: A Pack of Wolves (1991) .... Intelligence Officer Ghorpade
 Jigarwala (1991) .... Corrupt Officer
 Khoon Ka Karz (1991) .... Police Commissioner D.M. Mehta
 Paap Ki Aandhi (1991) .... Chinai
 Deshwasi (1991) .... Swami Satyanand
 Kurbaan.... Maan Singh
 Yeh Aag Kab Bujhegi (1991)... Defence Lawyer 
 Vishkanya (1991) .... Wali Khan
Geet Milan Ke Gaate Rahenge(1992)
Insaan Bana Shaitaan (1992)... Lawyer Sampatlal
 Virodhi (1992) .... Corrupt Police Inspector Amar Singh
 Laat Saab (1992) .... Nawab
 Khuda Gawah (1992) .... Insp. Aziz Mirza
 Isi Ka Naam Zindagi (1992) .... Chinky's Father
 Insaan Bana Shaitan (1992)
 Khel (1992)... as Vinod Brother Spl Appearance 
 Zindagi Ek Jua (1992) .... Mr. Rana
 Sahibaan (1993) as Diwan Durga 'Durge' Singh
 King Uncle (1993) as Mr. Malik
 Antim Nyay (1993) (uncredited) as Deputy Minister
 Krishan Avtaar (1993)
 Rang (1993) as Mr. Joshi
 Ekka Raja Rani (1994) as Police Commissioner
 Sholay Aur Toofan
 Chauraha (1994) as Police Commissioner
 Ishq Mein Jeena Ishq Mein Marna (1994)
 Naaraaz (1994) as Jagadamba
 Police Lock-up (1995) as Inspector Singhal
 Fauj (1995) as Thakur Karan Singh
 Aatank Hi Aatank (1995) as Gogia Advani
   Barsaat (1995 film)   (1995) as R.K. Mehra
 Ram Shastra (1995) as Dhonga's lawyer
 Saajan Chale Sasural (1996) as Thakur
 Himmatvar (1996) as Inspector Shrikant
Hai Kaun Woh (1999) as Prem
Agniputra (2000) as Governor Ashutosh Tripathi

TV series
 Zee Horror Show Taveez (1993) Episodes 3....Mahajan
 Campus (1993-1996) TV series .... Ganesh Bihari
 Parampara (1993-1997) TV series .... Dharam Chopra
 Aahat (1995) TV series Season 1 1995-2001 ....  Episode 82/83 The return (1 Episode only)
 Rahat (1995) TV series .... Mr Khanna
 Saans (1993-1997) TV series ....
 Amanat (1997-2002) TV series .... Ahmed Khan
 Sansaar (2001 - 2002)
 Bhagyavidhata (2009-2011) TV series .... Siddheshwar Sinha
 Tara (1993) TV series .... Ashok Sehgal (1993–1995)
 Chunauti (1987) TV series
Kahani Chandrakanta Ki (2011), Sahara One

Visual effects
 Cowman: The Uddered Avenger (2008) TV episode (digital effects artist)
 Pig Amok (2009) TV episode (digital effects artist)
 Sun Cow (2009) TV episode (digital effects artist)
 Doggelganger (2009) TV episode (digital effects artist)
 Save the Clams (2009) TV episode (digital effects artist)
 Back at the Barnyard (digital effects artist) (7 episodes, 2008–2009)

Director

 Raeeszada (1990)
 Barsaat Ki Raat (1998)

References

External links

Indian male film actors
Indian male television actors
Living people
Male actors in Hindi cinema
Place of birth missing (living people)
1940 births